Deadly Down Under is an Australian comedy reality television series on the Seven Network's 7mate. The series follows host Paul Fenech and presenters Jacquie Rodriquez and Elle Cooper in search  of the deadly of the deadliest creatures and places in Australia. They dive with great white sharks, handle venomous snakes and wrestle crocodiles, meet with the survivors of deadly attacks and trawl the history books for the deadliest events on record.

Cast
 Paul Fenech 
 Jacquie Rodriquez
 Elle Cooper
 Fonz

See also
 Bogan Hunters
 Housos
 Fat Pizza vs. Housos

References

English-language television shows
2010s Australian comedy television series
2010s Australian reality television series
2018 Australian television series debuts
Television shows set in Australia
7mate original programming
Television shows filmed in Australia